The Acura TLX is a four-door entry-level luxury sedan sold by Acura, a luxury division of Honda, since 2014. It is the successor to both the TL and TSX models. As of 2021, the discontinuation of the RLX leaves the TLX as the flagship sedan in Acura's lineup.

Design history
The Acura TLX was first shown as the "TLX Prototype", a sedan designed in Acura's Los Angeles Design Studio, as a replacement of the TL and TSX sedans. The production version was unveiled in April at the 2014 New York International Auto Show. Sales began in August, the TLX entered production during July at Marysville, Ohio, United States.

First generation (UB1/UB2/UB3/UB4; 2015) 

Two powertrain options are available. A 2.4-liter four-cylinder DOHC i-VTEC engine with direct injection was offered with front-wheel drive only, mated to a dual-clutch transmission and all-wheel steering (P-AWS). This model's chassis code is UB1. The Honda designed dual clutch transmission is the first to use a torque converter, which absorbs transmission gear shift shock, thus reducing NVH.

A 3.5-liter direct injected SOHC VTEC V-6 with cylinder deactivation (VCM) is mated to Honda's first time use of a 9-speed automatic transmission (sourced from ZF), available with either P-AWS or all-wheel drive (SH-AWD). The SH-AWD system uses hydraulic clutches instead of the electromagnetic clutch packs found on the previous TL which significantly cuts weight, size and cost. Model codes are UB2 for the front-wheel drive and UB3 for the SH-AWD, which comes standard with a "Technology Package". TLX models configured with the V6 engine lose nearly  compared to the FWD TL, and over  compared to the SH-AWD TL.

Overall length compared to the previous TL was reduced by  while the wheelbase maintains the same length. As with the ninth-generation Accord, the TLX loses the front double wishbone suspension of the TSX and TL in favor of a MacPherson strut arrangement, and loses the TL's all-aluminum front subframe in favor of a lower cost friction stir welded aluminum and steel piece.

To significantly cut down on interior noise, triple door seals are used as well as additional sound insulation.

Facelift (2017)

Acura unveiled the revised 2018 TLX in April 2017. Changes include revised front fascia, fenders, and grille, restyled wheels, and new infotainment features including Apple CarPlay and Android Auto support. Additionally, a new 'A-Spec' performance trim has been added.  Newly introduced features include an optional 360° surround camera and power driver's seat thigh extension. US sales began during June 2017.

In April 2017, an extended-wheelbase version specifically developed for the Chinese market was announced. It debuted in August 2017 at the Chengdu Motor Show and is called the Acura TLX-L. The TLX-L is only offered with the 2.4-liter four, producing  and receiving the UB4 model code.

Safety
TLX safety features include Lane Keeping Assist System with Road Departure Mitigation System, Adaptive Cruise Control with Low-Speed Follow, Blind Spot Information System, Tire Pressure Monitoring system with Tire Fill Assist, Collision Mitigation Braking System, and Vehicle Stability Assist. There are 7 airbags, including a driver's side knee airbag.

1 vehicle structure also rated "Acceptable"
2 strength-to-weight ratio: 5.67

Second generation (UB5/UB6/UB7; 2021) 

Based on the design of the Type S concept introduced in 2019, the second generation TLX launched digitally on May 28, 2020, production began on August 28, with sales following on September 28. This marks the return of the variant after a decade-long hiatus, which is scheduled to go on sale in showrooms starting on June 23, 2021. Without a direct replacement for the discontinued RLX, the TLX serves as the flagship Acura sedan, slotting above the ILX/Integra. The four-cylinder TLX's model code is UB5 for front-wheel drives and UB6 for the SH-AWD model, while the model code of the Type S is UB7.

Built on its own new platform, the TLX uses a front double wishbone suspension with forged aluminum lower control arms, mounted to cast aluminum damper towers and an aluminum subframe. To increase front suspension rigidity, a steel tubular strut bar connects the front damper towers together, with two additional bars tying each tower to the cowl in a triangular arrangement. Included on higher trims is a front subframe lower tie bar. To further reduce weight, the front fenders are aluminum, with the AGM battery moved to the rear to improve weight distribution.

In total, 64 percent of the body structure's mass comprises high-strength steel (HSS) and aluminum, with 1,500-MPa steel making up 10.1%. To further increase body rigidity a larger center tunnel, reinforced lengthwise with 980-MPa grade steel is used. A single-piece rear bulkhead steel stamping improves body rigidity without the rear seat brace found on previous TL models, allowing for a folding rear seat trunk pass-through. An underbody triangular brace is added to stiffen the rear suspension on AWD models.

An electric-servo brake-by-wire system similar to the second generation Acura NSX replaces the hydraulic brake, with Type S models adopting four-piston Brembo front brake calipers.

New options include adaptive dampers, a 10.5-inch head-up display (HUD), a 17-speaker audio system with four ceiling mounted speakers, open-pore wood, and 16-way power full grain leather front seats with four-way lumbar adjustability as introduced on the third generation RDX.

Type S 

Acura introduced a high-performance Type S variant for the second generation TLX, marking the return of the Type S brand after over a decade-long hiatus. All Type S models have Super Handling All-Wheel Drive (SH-AWD), which can send 70% of torque to the rear axle and as much as 100% of that torque to either rear wheel. Body structure is 13 percent stiffer than the standard TLX, while front spring rate as well as front and rear anti-roll bars are also stiffer compared to the standard model. The 10-speed automatic transmission is also upgraded over the regular TLX, with 40 percent quicker downshifts and 30 percent quicker upshifts. Braking performance is improved with four-piston Brembo front brakes. The car also contains an active exhaust system, which can alter the sound of the exhaust note depending on the selected drive mode.

In Car and Driver magazine's Lightning Lap test at the Virginia International Raceway's Grand West Course, the TLX Type S set a lap time of 3:06.7, which, for reference, was six tenths of a second faster than the Genesis G70 3.3T and five tenths off the time of the Cadillac CT4-V. The magazine commented that getting on the throttle as early as possible during cornering resulted in the best performance, as the SH-AWD system helps rotate the car; they felt that on-throttle "the car pivots productively but doesn't aggressively oversteer".

For the 2023 model year, Acura introduced a limited-production (300 units) TLX Type S PMC Edition, tuned by the Honda Performance Manufacturing Center, which specializes in assembling and tuning the NSX supercar. Changes for the PMC include 20-inch NSX inspired wheels and carbon fiber interior and exterior trim.

Safety 

To improve passenger safety in frontal oblique collisions, a front passenger three-chamber airbag, co-developed with Autoliv, is standard, and the ACE structure has been upgraded. The new airbag marketed as a "catcher's mitt" is designed to "catch" the occupant's head in the event of an oblique collision. During an impact, uninflated side panels help guide the occupant's head in the direction of inflated chambers acting as a "catcher's mitt." To disperse crash forces more effectively, two tunnel caps made from 780-MPa steel originate from the lower dash and end behind the front seats to direct crash loads away from the lower foot compartment.

The 2021 TLX was named an IIHS Top Safety Pick+, scoring good ratings in all six of the Institute's crashworthiness tests also earning a five-star overall safety rating from the NHTSA. The 2021 TLX comes standard with safety features such as adaptive cruise control, automatic emergency braking, and lane keeping assist. New for the 2021 model year is Traffic Jam Assist, which helps keep the car moving in stop-and-go traffic without the need for accelerator or brake inputs from the driver.

Motorsports
A TLX-GT race car version of the TLX SH-AWD, with a twin turbo version of the direct injection V6 engine found in the production TLX SH-AWD sedan, has also been developed by the Acura Motorsports Group at Honda Performance Development. It has a modified chassis and aerodynamic performance parts approved for Pirelli World Challenge competition. The TLX-GT was unveiled at the 2014 North American International Auto Show.

RealTime Racing entered a factory-backed car in the GT class at the Mid-Ohio and Sonoma rounds of the 2014 Pirelli World Challenge, with Peter Cunningham claiming a best result of 13th place. In 2015 the team fielded two full-time entries for Cunningham and Ryan Eversley; the latter won the first St. Petersburg race and finished sixth in the GT class drivers classification, whereas Cunningham finished 14th. Eversley continued as a full-time driver in 2016, winning the two Road America races. Cunningham raced the first half of the season, claiming a runner-up finish at Road America race 1, then Spencer Pumpelly took his place for the last three rounds.

The TLX-GT was replaced by the Acura NSX GT3 in 2017.

Sales

References

External links

 Acura TLX - Official Site
 Acura TLX News - Official Site

TLX
Cars introduced in 2014
2020s cars
Compact executive cars
Sedans
Front-wheel-drive vehicles
All-wheel-drive vehicles
Motor vehicles manufactured in the United States